Tricornis tricornis, common name the three-cornered conch, is a species of sea snail, a marine gastropod mollusk in the family Strombidae, the true conchs.

Description
The shell size varies between 65 mm and 170 mm.

Distribution
This species occurs in the Red Sea, the Gulf of Aden, the Indian Ocean off Djibouti, Eritrea and Somalia.

References

 Walls, J.G. (1980). Conchs, tibias and harps. A survey of the molluscan families Strombidae and Harpidae. T.F.H. Publications Ltd, Hong Kong.

External links
 

Strombidae
Gastropods described in 1786